Pingasa decristata is a moth of the family Geometridae first described by William Warren in 1902. It occurs on São Tomé Island.

References

Moths described in 1902
Pseudoterpnini
Moths of São Tomé and Príncipe
Fauna of São Tomé Island